Stranger Things Have Happened may refer to:

 Stranger Things Have Happened (Clare Maguire album)
 Stranger Things Have Happened (Justin Guarini album)
 Stranger Things Have Happened (Peter Tork album)
 Stranger Things Have Happened (Ronnie Milsap album)
 "Stranger Things Have Happened" (song), by Ronnie Milsap
 "Stranger Things Have Happened", a song by Foo Fighters from Echoes, Silence, Patience & Grace